Czartoryski Palace can refer to:
 Czartoryski Palace (Puławy)
 Czartoryski Palace (Vienna)
 Potocki Palace, Warsaw